Arhopala aedias yendava, the Singapore oakblue, is a subspecies of small butterfly found in India that belongs to the lycaenids or blues family.

Range
The butterfly occurs in India from Sikkim onto Myanmar.

Status
Rare.

See also
List of butterflies of India (Lycaenidae)

Cited references

References
 
 
 
 

Arhopala
Butterflies of Asia
Butterflies described in 1887
Taxa named by Henley Grose-Smith
Butterfly subspecies